Since being admitted to the Union in 1850, California has participated in 43 presidential elections. A bellwether from 1888 to 1996, voting for the losing candidates only three times in that span, California has become a reliable state for Democratic presidential candidates since 1992.

List

Bold indicates the presidential candidate who won the national election.

See also
 Elections in California
 List of United States Senate elections in California

Notes

References